Neil Dombrowski (born March 19, 1984 in West Allis, Wisconsin) is an American soccer player, who last played for the Portland Timbers of the USL First Division.

Youth
Dombrowski, one of four brothers who play professional soccer, grew up in Wisconsin, attending Nathan Hale High School.  In high school, he was three time All Conference and led his team in scoring as a senior.  He then attended the University of Wisconsin–Milwaukee, playing on the men’s soccer team from 2002 to 2005.  He played a total of 83 games over his four-year career, leading the team in goals and points his senior season.

Professional
In 2005, Dombrowski spent the collegiate off season with the Chicago Fire Premier of the fourth division Premier Development League.  In 2006, the Milwaukee Wave of the Major Indoor Soccer League selected Dombrowski in the first round (seventh overall) in the MISL Draft, but he did not sign with the Wave.  Instead, on April 11, 2006, he signed with the Rochester Raging Rhinos of the USL First Division.  In 2007, he moved to the Portland Timbers.  He played nineteen games, but suffered a season ending knee injury on August 26.  He was a regular with the Timbers in 2008, but did not sign with the team in 2009.

Personal
Neil is one of the Dombrowski brothers, all of whom are also professional soccer players: Scott Dombrowski, Zeke Dombrowski, Tighe Dombrowski and Chad Dombrowski.

References

External links
 Timbers profile

1982 births
American soccer players
Chicago Fire U-23 players
Association football midfielders
Living people
People from West Allis, Wisconsin
Portland Timbers (2001–2010) players
Rochester New York FC players
Soccer players from Wisconsin
USL First Division players
USL League Two players
Milwaukee Panthers men's soccer players
Sportspeople from the Milwaukee metropolitan area